The Manitowoc Company, Inc. was founded in 1902 and, through its wholly owned subsidiaries, designs, manufactures, markets, and supports mobile telescopic cranes, tower cranes, lattice-boom crawler cranes, and boom trucks under the Grove, Manitowoc, National Crane, Potain, Shuttlelift and Manitowoc Crane Care brand names.

History

Manitowoc Company, Inc. was founded by Charles West and Elias Gunnell in the lakeshore community of Manitowoc, Wisconsin, in 1902. It was known as a shipbuilding and ship-repair company under the name Manitowoc Shipbuilding Company. The company grew and diversified, entering the lattice-boom crane business in the mid-1920s and branching into commercial refrigeration equipment shortly after World War II. During World War II, the Department of the Navy contracted Manitowoc to build a total of 28 submarines, plus the canceled USS Chicolar (SS-464). Before they built the submarines for the Department of the Navy, the company built car ferries. In November 2002, the company acquired the Grove Crane company for approximately $271 million. In March 2016, Manitowoc completed the tax-free spin-off of its food service equipment operations, placing itself as a standalone crane company.

Lifting Solutions

Manitowoc produces several lines of cranes to serve the construction, energy, and numerous other industries. The company produces high-capacity lattice-boom crawler cranes, tower cranes, and mobile telescopic cranes for heavy construction, commercial construction, residential construction, energy-related uses, wind farm, infrastructure, duty-cycle, crane-rental applications, among others. It is also a producer of boom trucks. The company has a thriving after-sales business as well, providing service, parts, renovation and training.

Main Brands:
 Manitowoc cranes — Crawler cranes
 Grove cranes — rough-terrain, truck-mounted, all-terrain, Grove YardBoss, industrial cranes and Shuttlelift carry deck cranes. Grove began producing cranes in 1947 in Shady Grove, Pa.

 Potain cranes — Tower cranes and self-erecting tower cranes. Founded in La Clayette, France in 1928.
 National Crane — Telescoping boom trucks (articulating line was discontinued at the end of 2008). Founded in Waverly, Nebraska, in 1963 and all production of National Crane Boom Trucks moved to Shady Grove, Pennsylvania, after the acquisition by Manitowoc.
 Manitowoc Crane Care — Customer service branch established in 2000. Crane Care operates in 15 countries at 22 locations.

Food Service division
Manitowoc Foodservice was a sub-division of the Manitowoc Company, producing ice machines and refrigeration equipment for businesses.

The company acquired SerVend International, a manufacturer of ice and beverage systems equipment for the foodservice industry, in October 1997.

In 2008, the company acquired Enodis PLC, a UK-based supplier of restaurant equipment, including fryers, ovens, and ice machines. Manitowoc Foodservice announced that they would be selling off the ice division of Enodis, and the sale of that division has been completed.

On March 4, 2016, The Manitowoc Company completed a one for one common share split and created Manitowoc Foodservice.  As of March 7, 2016 the newly created company began standard stock offerings on the NYSE under the symbol "MFS" Manitowoc Foodservice rebranded itself as Welbilt, Inc. and now trades under the symbol "WBT".

The newly formed company is under the leadership of former Manitowoc Company executive Hubertus M. Muehlhaeuser, who currently has eight direct reports are the current executives.  They are supported by a seven-member board of directors which includes Mr. Muehlhaeuser.

Manitowoc Foodservice consisted of 23 global brands that include 12 holding either #1 or #2 position in their respected global markets.

Marine division
Manitowoc Marine was a subdivision of the Manitowoc Company, which builds and repairs commercial and military ships at yards in Marinette, Wisconsin; Sturgeon Bay, Wisconsin; and Cleveland, Ohio. The Marinette shipyard, Marinette Marine, built the first Freedom class littoral combat ship for the United States Navy, and the United States Coast Guard Cutter Mackinaw. In August 2008, Manitowoc Marine Division repaired the SS Badger The Manitowoc Company announced in August 2008 a proposal to sell the marine division to Italian shipbuilder Fincantieri.  The sale closed on December 31, 2008.

Corporate governance 
 Kenneth W. Krueger — Chairman of the Board, The Manitowoc Company, Inc.
 Aaron H. Ravenscroft — President and Chief Executive Officer, The Manitowoc Company, Inc.
David J. Antoniuk - Executive Vice President and Chief Financial Officer, The Manitowoc Company, Inc.
Thomas L. Doerr, Jr. - Executive Vice President, General Counsel and Secretary, The Manitowoc Company, Inc.
Leslie L. Middleton - Executive Vice President Mobile Cranes, The Manitowoc Company, Inc.
Terrance L. Collins - Executive Vice President, Human Resources, The Manitowoc Company, Inc.
Brian P. Regan - Vice President, Corporate Controller and Principal Accounting Officer, The Manitowoc Company, Inc.

See also
 Manitowoc Shipbuilding Company - early subsidiary

References

External links

Companies listed on the New York Stock Exchange
Manufacturing companies based in Wisconsin
Manufacturing companies established in 1902
Manitowoc County, Wisconsin
Crane manufacturers
1902 establishments in Wisconsin
Construction equipment manufacturers of the United States
Companies based in Wisconsin